Sebastià 'Tià' Sastre Catalá (born 21 June 1994) is a Spanish footballer who plays as an attacking midfielder.

Football career
Born in Vilafranca de Bonany, Balearic Islands, Sastre grew in the youth ranks of local giants RCD Mallorca. On 14 December 2011, whilst still a junior, he made his official debut with the first team, playing 31 minutes in a 0–1 home loss against Sporting de Gijón for the season's Copa del Rey.

Sastre subsequently spent the following campaigns appearing mainly for the reserves in Segunda División B. On 7 June 2015 he made his Segunda División debut, coming on as a late substitute for fellow youth graduate Damià Sabater in a 0–2 away loss against CD Mirandés.

On 29 January 2016, Sastre was loaned to CE L'Hospitalet in the third division, until June. On 28 August of the following year he moved to another reserve team, Celta de Vigo B in the same category.

References

External links

1994 births
Living people
Footballers from Mallorca
Spanish footballers
Association football midfielders
Segunda División players
Segunda División B players
Tercera División players
RCD Mallorca B players
RCD Mallorca players
CE L'Hospitalet players
Celta de Vigo B players
Spain youth international footballers